Hans Ruch (8 September 1898 – 8 August 1947) was a German international footballer who played for Union 92 Berlin and Hertha BSC.

References

External links
 

1898 births
1947 deaths
Association football forwards
German footballers
Germany international footballers
Hertha BSC players